"The Village Schoolmaster", or "The Giant Mole" ("Der Dorfschullehrer" or "Der Riesenmaulwurf") is an unfinished short story by Franz Kafka. The story, written in December 1914 and the beginning of 1915, was not published in Kafka's lifetime. It first appeared in Beim Bau der Chinesischen Mauer (Berlin, 1931). The first English translation by Willa and Edwin Muir was published by Martin Secker in London in 1933. It appeared in The Great Wall of China. Stories and Reflections (New York: Schocken Books, 1946).

Plot introduction

The narrator discusses the phenomenon of a giant mole in a far village, and the attempt of the village schoolmaster to bring its existence to the public attention, only to become an object of derision to the scientific community. Without knowing the schoolmaster, the narrator tries to defend him and his honesty in a paper about the giant mole. The narrator's attempts to help, stretched out in an unspecified stretch of years, are even more unsuccessful, only inspiring the teacher's jealousy and bitterness. In an argument during Christmas he and the village schoolmaster reveal the wildly different outcomes they had been hoping for all along. Without being able to finish the conversation, they reach a stalemate and the story ends abruptly.

Process of writing
Kafka discusses the story in a diary entry from December 19, 1914:
Yesterday wrote "The village schoolmaster" almost without knowing it, but was afraid to go on writing later than a quarter to two; the fear was well founded, I slept hardly at all, merely suffered through perhaps three short dreams and was then in the office in the condition one would expect. Yesterday father's reproaches on account of the factory: 'you talked me into it.' Then went home and calmly wrote for three hours in the consciousness that my guilt is beyond question, though not so great as father pictures it.

In a January 6, 1915 entry Kafka mentions abandoning the story.

References

 Kafka, Franz (ed. Nahum N. Glatzer). The Complete Stories of Franz Kafka. New York: Schocken Books, 1995.

Footnotes

1931 short stories
Short stories by Franz Kafka
Unfinished books